The A-Group culture was an ancient culture that flourished between the First and Second Cataracts of the Nile in Nubia. It lasted from  3800 BC to  3100 BC.

Overview

In 1907, the Egyptologist George A. Reisner first discovered artifacts belonging to the A-Group culture. Early hubs of this civilization included Kubaniyya in the north and Buhen in the south, with Aswan, Sayala, Toshka and Qustul in between.

The A-Group population have been described as ethnically “very similar” to the pre-dynastic Egyptians in physical characteristics. The A-Group makers maintained commercial ties with the Ancient Egyptians. They traded commodities like incense, ebony and ivory, which were gathered from the southern riverine area. They also bartered carnelian from the Western Desert as well as gold mined from the Eastern Desert in exchange for Egyptian products, olive oil and other items from the Mediterranean basin.

Excavation findings 

The A-Group makers left behind a number of cemeteries, with each necropolis containing around fifty graves. Most of what is known about this culture has been gleaned from these tombs, over 3,000 of which have been excavated. The burials are of two kinds: a more common oval pit, and a similar pit featuring a lateral funerary niche. Skeletons found within these graves were observed to be physically akin to their peers in Upper Egypt. The specimens typically had straight hair of a black or dark brown hue. On average, the men were 169.9 cm in height and the women stood around 155.5 cm. Some individuals were wrapped in leather and positioned on reed mats. All of the tombs contained various burial items, including personal ornaments, utensils and ceramics.

Dental trait analysis of A-Group fossils found affinities with populations inhabiting Northeast Africa the Nile valley, and East Africa. Among the sampled populations, the A-Group people were nearest to the Kerma culture bearers and Kush populations in Upper Nubia and to Ethiopians, followed by the Meroitic, X-Group and Christian period inhabitants of Lower Nubia and the Kellis population in the Dakhla Oasis, as well as C-Group and Pharaonic era skeletons excavated in Lower Nubia and ancient Egyptians (Naqada, Badari, Hierakonpolis, Abydos and Kharga in Upper Egypt; Hawara in Lower Egypt).

In 2007, Strouhal et al described the physical features of ancient A-Group Nubians as "Caucasoid" which were "not distinguishable from the contemporary Predynastic Upper Egyptians of the Badarian and Nagadian cultures" based in reference to previous anthropological studies from 1975 and 1985.

In 2020, Kanya Godde analysed a series of crania which included two Egyptian (predynastic Badarian and Naqada series), a series of A-Group Nubians, and a Bronze Age series from Lachish, Palestine. The two pre-dynastic series had strongest affinities, followed by closeness between the Naqada and the Nubian series. Further, the Nubian A-Group plotted nearer to the Egyptians and the Lachish sample placed more closely to Naqada than Badari. According to Godde the spatial-temporal model applied to the pattern of biological distances explains the more distant relationship of Badari to Lachish than Naqada to Lachish as gene flow will cause populations to become more similar over time. Overall, both Egyptian samples were more similar to the Nubian series than to the Lachish series.

Excavations at an A-Group cemetery in Qustul yielded an old incense burner, which was adorned with Ancient Egyptian royal iconography. However, further research established the antecedence of the predynastic Egyptian regalia:
More recent and broader studies have determined that the distinct pottery styles, differing burial practices, different grave goods and the distribution of sites all indicate that the Naqada people and the Nubian A-Group people were from different cultures. Kathryn Bard further states that "Naqada cultural burials contain very few Nubian craft goods, which suggests that while Egyptian goods were exported to Nubia and were buried in A-Group graves, A-Group goods were of little interest further north." Nubian excavations in Serra East found that the bodies buried in the A-Group cemeteries would lay on either side with their head facing south or east. Similar to that of a curled-up position, their hands could be found near the face and their legs folded-in upwards. Leather wrappings were also found in the burials as a means of clothing and bags. However, this leather wrapping was not typically found in more lavish cemeteries, such as  L at Qustul. As for distinct pottery styles, decorative vessels were more likely to be found in larger tombs at Qustul, whereas simpler burial arrangements contained ripple-burnished or simple vessels. However, the archaeological cemeteries at Qustul are no longer available for excavations since the flooding of Lake Nasser.According to David Wengrow, the A-Group polity of the late 4th millenninum BCE is poorly understand since most of the archaeological remains are submerged underneath Lake Nasser.   

Oshiro Michinori argued, in reference to the A-Group culture, that the external influence from Nubia on the formation of Ancient Egypt in the pre-dynastic period to the dynasty period predates influence from eastern Mesopotamia.  He notes an increase in the appreciation of the contribution of Nubia in the south to Ancient Egyptian culture at the time of his writing.  According to him, chiefs of the same cultural level as Upper Egyptian powers existed in Lower Nubia and exhibited pharaonic iconography before the unification of Egypt.

A-Group linguistics 
The linguistic affinity of the A-Group culture is unknown, but, according to Claude Rilly, it is unlikely to have spoken a language of the Northern East Sudanic branch of Nilo-Saharan. Beyond this Rilly states that "the range of possibilities remains wide" and includes: a language belonging to another (non-Northern East Sudanic) branch of the Nilo-Saharan family, a Cushitic language, or other Afro-Asiatic language.

Debate about the origin of the first pharaohs 
In 1980, archeologist Bruce Williams conducted an excavation titled “The Lost Pharaohs of Nubia,” arguing that the Egyptian pharaonic monarchy was situated in Nubia, rather than in Egypt during the times of the A-group. He based his discoveries at the Qustul cemetery on three archaeological finds: the size of the tombs, their plethora of contents, and royal iconography (such as pottery vessels and stone censers). His claims, however, lead to criticism and defense from scholars such as William Y. Adams and Maria Carmela Gatto, respectively. Gatto argued that Bruce Williams explicitly denied making such a sweeping claim, saying that he was only trying to "raise the strong possibility that Egypt’s founding dynasty originated near Qustul and that the unification was accomplished from Nubia.” Gatto added that "Whatever the claim, the (for some scholars) inconceivable idea of a primary role for Nubia in the rise of the Egyptian monarchy has been reconsidered after more recent finds in Upper Egypt dating back to the Naqada I period the early manifestations of elite iconography." while noting "That the tombs found in Qustul were exceptional and comparable to those of the earliest Egyptian rulers remains, nevertheless, a fact." While Gatto mentions that the tombs found in Qustul were comparable to that of Egyptian ruler's tombs, William Y. Adams suggests that the large size and contents of their grave support an approach different from that of Bruce Williams. He states that “The large tombs and their abundant contents may argue for a more stratified society than we had previously envisioned in the A-group period, but they are not evidence for a monarchical state.” Adams also argues that the Qustul incense burner found in the cemetery may be better suited to prove that the monarchy was situated somewhere near the Nile Valley instead of the monarchy being initially situated in Nubia.

Existential crisis of the B-Group 
The A-Group culture came to an end around 3100 BCE, when it was destroyed, apparently by the First Dynasty rulers of Egypt. Following the A-Group culture, Reisner originally identified a B-Group and C-Group culture that existed within Nubia. However, this theory became obsolete when Henry S. Smith demonstrated that the "B-Group" was an impoverished manifestation of the A-Group culture. With the existential crisis of the B-Group, it is suggested that these burials were simply poorer versions of A-group burials and that the span of the A-group culture lasted beyond 3100 BCE.

References

External links
 
 Regional variations in the so-called “A-Group” Culture of Lower Nubia
 Hans-Åke Nordstrom : The Nubian A-Group
 Maria Gatto: Hunting for the Exclusive Nubian A-Group People; Renée Friedman: Setting the Scene
 Nubian Cultures: A and C-Group
 
 The Exhibit of Nubian Antiquities
 Nancy C. Lovell: Nubian A- and C-Groups
 Maria Carmela Gatto: The Nubian A-group: a reassessment

History of Nubia
Neolithic cultures of Africa
4th-millennium BC establishments
4th-millennium BC disestablishments
1907 archaeological discoveries
Archaeological cultures in Egypt
Kerma culture